Köda is the third album by In the Nursery, released in 1988 through Wax Trax! Records.

Track listing

Personnel 
In the Nursery
Klive Humberstone – instruments
Nigel Humberstone – instruments
Q. – percussion
Dolores Marguerite C – narration
Production and additional personnel
Chris Bigg – design
In the Nursery – production
Brian Pitkin – photography
Colin Richardson – production

References

External links 
 

1988 albums
In the Nursery albums
Wax Trax! Records albums